Shenaphaenops is a genus of beetles in the family Carabidae, containing the following species:

 Shenaphaenops cursor Ueno, 1999
 Shenaphaenops humeralis Ueno, 1999
 Shenaphaenops majusculus Ueno, 1999

References

Trechinae